The Genoa International or Internazionale di Genova at times also known as the Genoa Championships or Campionati di Genova was a men's and women's international clay court tennis tournament founded in 1959. It was played at the Tennis Club Genova, Genoa, Liguria, Italy. The tournament ran until 1968.

History
In April 1928 Tennis Club Genova in Genoa, established an open international tennis tournament for men and women. The tournament was played on outdoor clay courts in Liguria, Italy. The event was part of the Italian Riviera circuit of tennis tournaments. During the 1930s the tournament was branded as the Genoa Championships or Campionati di Genova. The 1940 edition was held in conjunction with the Coppa Federazione Fascista. The tournament was staged till 1968.

Finals

Men's singles
(incomplete roll) included:

Men's doubles
(incomplete roll)

Women's singles
(incomplete roll)

Mixed doubles
(incomplete roll)

References

Clay court tennis tournaments
Defunct tennis tournaments in Italy